is a former Japanese football player.

Playing career
Tonoike was born in Yokohama on January 29, 1975. After graduating from Waseda University, he joined J1 League club Bellmare Hiratsuka (later Shonan Bellmare) in 1997. He played as forward in 1997 and 1998 season. The club released many players due to their financial problems end of 1998 season. In 1999, although he played many matches as midfielder, the club was finished at bottom place and was relegated to J2 League. In 2000, he moved to his local club Yokohama F. Marinos. Although he played many matches as forward in 2000, his opportunity to play decreased in 2001. In August 2001, he moved to J2 club Omiya Ardija on loan. In 2002, he returned to Yokohama F. Marinos. However he could hardly play in the match. In 2003, he moved to J2 club Ventforet Kofu. He became a regular player as defensive midfielder. In 2004, he moved to Sanfrecce Hiroshima. However he could not play many matches. In 2005, he moved to J2 club Montedio Yamagata. He played as defensive midfielder. In 2006, he moved to his first club Shonan Bellmare. Although he played as midfielder in 2006, he played as forward at own hope in 2007. He retired end of 2007 season.

Club statistics

References

External links

1975 births
Living people
Waseda University alumni
Association football people from Kanagawa Prefecture
Japanese footballers
J1 League players
J2 League players
Shonan Bellmare players
Yokohama F. Marinos players
Omiya Ardija players
Ventforet Kofu players
Sanfrecce Hiroshima players
Montedio Yamagata players
Association football forwards
Association football midfielders